Brickellia problematica is a |Mexican species of flowering plants in the family Asteraceae. It is native to western Mexico in the states of Puebla and Oaxaca.

References

problematica
Endemic flora of Mexico
Flora of Puebla
Flora of Oaxaca
Plants described in 1908
Taxa named by Townshend Stith Brandegee